Hamyeol Namgung clan is one of the Korean clans. Their Bon-gwan is in Iksan, North Jeolla Province. According to the research held in 2015, the number of Hamyeol Namgung clan was 20715. Namgung su who was the Imperial family in Zhou dynasty, China started Korean Namgung clan. When Gija conquered Korea, Namgung su founded Gija Joseon with Gija and worked as Situ (office). Namgung su taught Koreans etiquette, agriculture, rice farming, sericulture and weaving. The founder of Hamyeol Namgung clan was  who was a descendant of Namgung su.  worked as Four-star rank and Pingzhangshi in Goryeo.

See also 
 Korean clan names of foreign origin

References

External links 
 

 
Namgung clans
Korean clan names of Chinese origin